is a passenger railway station in the city of Takasaki, Gunma, Japan, operated by the private railway operator Jōshin Dentetsu.

Lines

Station layout
The station consists of a single side platform serving traffic in both directions. There is no station building.

Adjacent stations

History
It was renamed to its present name on 15 January 1953.

Surrounding area

See also
 List of railway stations in Japan

External links

 Jōshin Dentetsu 
Burari Gunma 

Railway stations in Gunma Prefecture
Railway stations in Japan opened in 1935
Takasaki, Gunma